Allies is a 2014 British Independent World War II film written by Jeremy Sheldon and directed by Dominic Burns. It stars Julian Ovenden, Chris Reilly, Matt Willis, Edmund Kingsley, Leon Vickers, Mark Moraghan, Paul Ridley, Frank Leboeuf, and Steven Hartley. Allies was released on 1 November 2014 in the UK and is distributed by eOne.

Premise
In August 1944, a team of British soldiers led by a US Captain are dropped behind enemy lines in France on a mission that could shorten the war. As nothing goes according to plan, commando Sergeant Harry McBain (Chris Reilly) and Captain Gabriel Jackson (Julian Ovenden) know they must put aside personal animosity if the mission is to succeed.

Cast

Julian Ovenden - Captain Gabriel Jackson
Chris Reilly - Sergeant Harry McBain
Matt Willis - Private Billy Munns
Edmund Kingsley - Private Yorkie Jones
Leon Vickers - Private Jim Scales
Frank Leboeuf - Marcel Deville
Erich Redman - Lieutenant Colonel Kaltz
Werner Daehn - Captain Dekker
Emmanuelle Bouaziz - Catherine
Mark Moraghan - Colonel Slade
Steven Hartley - Brigadier General Groves
Paul Ridley - Major Davis
David Sterne - Pierre
Jonathan Power - Captain Williams
Jamie Darlington - Lieutenant Edwards
Felix Auer - Werther
Robert Stevens - Private Ash
James Lloyd - Flight Marshall
Richard Bishop - Braun's SS Soldier #2
Darren Sean Enright - Sid The Barman
Zachary Fall - Jean
Michael Koltes - Joachim
Jack Lindley - German ADC
Tim Major - German Spy
Colin Mcleod - Col. Kellermann
Jens Nier - Officer Braun
Richard Lee Clines - Braun's SS Soldier #1
Richard Bishop - Braun's SS Soldier #2
David Whitney - Piper

Soundtrack
The soundtrack for the film was composed, orchestrated, and conducted by Philippe Jakko. It was released on 11 November 2014 (digital) and 25 November 2014 (CD).

Track list
 Opening 3:41
 Brothers 2:21
 Harry's Moment 3:44
 Troops in the Fields 2:34
 Partisans 5:20
 Forest Battle 4:03
 Dakota Flight 2:21
 German Camp 2:54
 Brothers' Car Ride 1:49
 In the Hut 1:43
 The Village 3:26
 The Ambush 1:43
 Billy's Moment 3:36
 Harry and Catherine 4:37
 Traitor + Hero 4:13

Release
The film premièred in director Dominic Burns' home town of Derby to a five hundred-strong sell out crowd on 1 November 2014.

Reception
Gary Collinson of pop culture site Flickering Myth gave the film three stars, describing it as, 'a largely likeable project with its heart in the right place and it develops some interesting personable scenes between the main players.' Jon Lyus of HeyUGuys praised the film's ambition and production values, saying, 'Burns' confidence continues to grow; here he has found a solid story to tell and creates some impactful visual flourishes and benefits from a winning cast.'

See also
 2014 in film
 List of British films of 2014
 Lancaster Skies, another microbudget war film, focusing on the British bombing campaign.

References

External links
 

2014 films
Films shot in England
British historical films
British war drama films
2010s war drama films
2010s historical films
British World War II films
World War II films based on actual events
2010s English-language films
Films directed by Dominic Burns
2010s British films